
Year 821 (DCCCXXI) was a common year starting on Tuesday (link will display the full calendar) of the Julian calendar.

Events 
 By place 

 Byzantine Empire 
 Byzantine general Thomas the Slav leads a revolt, and secures control over most of the Byzantine themes (provinces) in Anatolia. He gets recognition from the Abbasid Caliphate, and concludes a peace treaty with Caliph al-Ma'mun. Thomas crosses with his fleet from Abydos to Thrace, and blockades Emperor Michael II in Constantinople; but Thomas' first attack on the capital fails.

 Europe 
 February – Duke Borna of Croatia dies after an 11-year reign, as vassal of the Frankish Empire. He is succeeded by his nephew, Vladislav. Emperor Louis I recognizes him as prince of Dalmatia and Liburnia, at the Council of Aachen.
 October – Lothair I, co-emperor and eldest son of Louis I, marries Ermengarde in Thionville (northeastern France). She is the daughter of Count Hugh of Tours.

 Britain 
 King Coenwulf of Mercia dies in Basingwerk near Holywell (Wales), while preparing for another assault on Powys, and is buried in Winchcombe Abbey. He is briefly succeeded by his son Cynehelm, but he is killed, probably fighting the Welsh, though supposedly through the treachery of his sister Cwenthryth. The Mercian throne passes to Coenwulf's brother, Ceolwulf I.

 Abbasid Caliphate 
 By the time Al-Ma'mun became caliph, the Arabs and the Byzantines had settled down into border skirmishing, with Arab raids deep into Anatolia to capture booty.
 Tahir ibn Husayn, an Iranian general, is appointed as governor of Khurasan, as a reward for supporting the Abbasid caliph al-Ma'mun in the Fourth Fitna. 
 Caliph Al-Ma'mun appointed Nu'aym ibn al-Waddah al-Azdi as the governor of Yemen in 821.

Births 
 Gao Pian, general of the Tang dynasty (d. 887)
 Gisela, Frankish princess, daughter of Louis the Pious
 Ibn Abi Asim, Muslim Sunni scholar (or 822)
 Ordoño I, king of Asturias (approximate date)

Deaths 
 April 7 – George the Standard-Bearer, archbishop of Mytilene (b. c. 776)
 May 2 – Liu Zong, general of the Tang Dynasty
 December 18 – Theodulf, bishop of Orléans
 Arno, archbishop of Salzburg 
 Artrí mac Cathail, king of Munster (Ireland)
 Benedict of Aniane, Frankish monk
 Borna, duke (knez) of Croatia
 Coenwulf, king of Mercia
 Egbert, bishop of Lindisfarne 
 Guisclafred, Frankish nobleman (approximate date)
 Li Su, general of the Tang dynasty (b. 773)
 Tian Hongzheng, general of the Tang dynasty (b. 764)
 Wei Guanzhi, chancellor of the Tang dynasty (b. 760)
 Zheng Yuqing, chancellor of the Tang dynasty (b. 746)

References